Werdyger, Werdiger, and Verdiger is a surname from the Polish word weredyk, meaning "truthful person".

People with this surname include:

David Werdyger (born c. 1920), Polish-American hazzan
Mendy Werdyger (born 1959), American Jewish singer and owner of Aderet Music/Mostly Music in Brooklyn, New York
Mordechai Werdyger (born 1951), American Jewish singer known as Mordechai Ben David

References